The Frost King Stakes is a Thoroughbred horse race run annually in mid November at Woodbine Racetrack in Toronto, Ontario, Canada. An Ontario Sire Stakes, it is a restricted race for two-year-olds and is raced over a distance of seven furlongs on Polytrack synthetic dirt. It currently carries a purse of $97,900.

The race was named in honor of Frost King, the 1982 Canadian Horse of the Year and a Canadian Horse Racing Hall of Fame inductee.

Records
Speed  record: 
 1:23.09 - Stuck In Traffic (2007) (on Polytrack)
 1:24.20 - Eastern Answer (on dirt)

Most wins by an owner:
 2 - Ralph Lococo & Mary Biamonte (2011, 2013)

Most wins by a jockey:
 3 - Patrick Husbands (2011, 2012, 2013)
 2 - Richard Dos Ramos (1997, 2002)
 2 - Todd Kabel (1999, 2004)

Most wins by a trainer:
  2 - Ralph Biamonte (2011, 2013)

Winners of the Frost King Stakes

References
 The Frost King Stakes at Pedigree Query

Ontario Sire Stakes
Ungraded stakes races in Canada
Flat horse races for two-year-olds
Recurring sporting events established in 1997
Woodbine Racetrack